Stagnation may refer to one of the following
Economic stagnation, slow or no economic growth. 
Era of Stagnation, a period of economic stagnation in Soviet Union
Lost Decade (Japan), a period of economic stagnation in Japan
Stagnation in fluid dynamics, see "Stagnation point"
Water stagnation
Air stagnation
"Stagnation", song from Genesis' album Trespass